Constant d'Aubigné (158531 August 1647) was a French nobleman, son of Théodore-Agrippa d'Aubigné, the poet, soldier, propagandist and chronicler.

Life
Born into a Huguenot family, Constant led a less structured life, first embracing Protestantism and then the Catholic causes, visiting England and then in 1626 betraying the Protestants by revealing English plans to take La Rochelle.  As a result, he was disinherited by his father.

Final Days
Richelieu had d'Aubigné and his family imprisoned at Niort in 1629 for correspondence with the English.  Released in 1639 following the death of Richelieu, the family went to the French West Indies, where d'Aubigné had been made governor of Marie-Galante, though he and his family remained on Martinique. d'Aubigné returned around 1645, nearly destitute, and died in Provence in 1647. His wife and children returned to France the same year.

Legacy
Constant was twice married. His first wife, Anne Marchant, left a son, Theodore. 
His second wife, Jeanne de Cardilhac, was the mother of Charles (father of Françoise Charlotte d'Aubigné), Mme. de Maintenon and the Chevalier d'Aubigné; the latter was never married. The d'Aubigné line was continued through Anne Marchant's son, Theodore (1613–1670) .

Notes

Resources
 Haag, Eugéne & Émile. "La France Protestante". Paris, 1877.
 Smedes, Susan Dabney. "A Southern Planter: Social Life in the Old South". Pott, 1887; p. 7,8
 Bellet, Jaquelin & Jaquelin. "Some Prominent Virginia Families". J.P. Bell company, 1907; pp. 87–93

1580s births
1647 deaths
French knights
Baron of Surimeau
Constant